Soyu Stadium, formerly known as , is an athletic stadium in Akita, Akita, Japan.
Located approximately 3 kilometers from the city center, the Akita Yabase Stadium is a multi-use facility opened in September 1941. It has been renovated several times, including a complete rebuilding in 1981, track repairs in 1985, and modifications in 1995 to accommodate the requirements for J.League soccer.

The stadium was the main venue for the World Games 2001.  It also hosted the National Sports Festival of Japan in 1961 and 2007.
The facilities is the home stadium for the Blaublitz Akita, a J.League team.

Naming rights
The oldest and largest stadium in Akita was renamed in April 2019 when the Soyu Corporation purchased the naming rights. The agreement was reported as being worth 3.5 million yen per year.

Gallery

Access

From Akita Station:  for Rinkai Eigyosho, Tsuchizaki via Terauchi etc. Get off at Yabase Kyujo-mae.
Access to Soyu Stadium

References

External links
 Stadium information

Location map

2001 World Games
Athletics (track and field) venues in Japan
Blaublitz Akita
Football venues in Japan
Rugby union stadiums in Japan
Saruta Kogyo SC
Sports venues in Akita Prefecture
Buildings and structures in Akita (city)
Sports venues completed in 1941
1941 establishments in Japan